Jerry Joseph Stephenson (October 6, 1943 – June 6, 2010) was an American Major League Baseball pitcher and longtime scout. As a player, Stephenson appeared for all or parts of seven seasons for the Boston Red Sox (1963; 1965–68), Seattle Pilots (1969) and Los Angeles Dodgers (1970). Born in Detroit, Michigan, and raised in Hermosa Beach and Anaheim, California, Stephenson was a graduate of Anaheim High School and California State University, Fullerton.

During his MLB career, Stephenson compiled a won–lost record of 8–19, 184 strikeouts, three complete games, one save, and a 5.70 earned run average in 67 games (33 as a starting pitcher) and 238 innings pitched. He allowed 265 hits and 145 bases on balls. His one save came on August 19, 1967 during the Red Sox "Impossible Dream" season. Stephenson got the last two outs against the Angels to close out a wild 12–11 Red Sox victory at Fenway Park.

He was regarded as a top prospect until he hurt his elbow while pitching for the 1964 Seattle Rainiers of the Triple-A Pacific Coast League; until he was injured, he had posted a 6–4 record and an ERA of 1.57 in 14 starts, along with 97 strikeouts and only 61 hits allowed in 92 innings pitched. Six years later, as a veteran, he went 18–5 with a 2.82 ERA in 28 starts for the Triple-A Spokane Indians, the Dodgers' top affiliate, pitching for manager Tommy Lasorda.

The son of former MLB catcher and longtime Boston scout Joe Stephenson, Stephenson spent 36 years as a Major League scout with the Dodgers (1974–94) and Red Sox (1995–2009) before his retirement to part-time status after the  season. His son Brian Stephenson, a former minor league pitcher, is a regional crosschecker for the Dodgers — the third generation of the family to serve as an MLB scout.

Stephenson died from cancer at his home in Anaheim on Sunday, June 6, 2010, at the age of 66.

See also
List of second-generation Major League Baseball players

References

External links

Retrosheet

1943 births
2010 deaths
Albuquerque Dukes players
Baseball players from Anaheim, California
Baseball players from Michigan
Boston Red Sox players
Boston Red Sox scouts
Deaths from lung cancer in California
Los Angeles Dodgers players
Los Angeles Dodgers scouts
Major League Baseball pitchers
Major League Baseball scouts
Reading Red Sox players
Seattle Pilots players
Seattle Rainiers players
Spokane Indians players
Toronto Maple Leafs (International League) players
Vancouver Mounties players
Winston-Salem Red Sox players